This is a list of countries by military expenditure per capita, the amount spent by a nation on its military per capita in a given year. This list is sourced from the Stockholm International Peace Research Institute (SIPRI) for the year 2020.

As of 2021, the top five per capita spenders are Qatar (~$3955), Israel (~$2770), United States (~$2405), Kuwait (~$2085) and Singapore (~$1885). All five countries have increased their spending since the previous year (2020).

The UAE, for which recent data is not available, has also spent historically large amounts of money on the military on a per capita basis. The UAE had a per capita spending of $2470 per person back in 2014, making it the second highest spender in that year just after Saudi Arabia, but by 2020 that number had fallen to 2020.4.

Military expenditure per capita spending

In the table below, numbers are in USD. "" means the country did not exist at the time or was not independent, and "" means that the data are unavailable.

See also
Military budget
List of countries by military expenditures
Past military expenditure by country

References

Military expenditure per capita

Government budgets
Military lists
Military budgets